Louisiana's 6th congressional district is a congressional district in the U.S. state of Louisiana. Located in south-central Louisiana, the district contains most of the state capital of Baton Rouge, the bulk of Baton Rouge's suburbs, and continues south to Houma. It also includes the western shores of Lake Pontchartrain.

The district is currently represented by Republican Garret Graves.

History
Since the 6th congressional district's creation, its boundaries have migrated from a position astraddle the Mississippi River to completely east of the Mississippi River and more recently astraddle the river again.

For decades prior to 1974, the district was virtually coterminous with the Florida Parishes. In 1974, the 6th congressional district shed St. Tammany Parish to the 1st congressional district, and since then several redistrictings have incrementally moved the district's boundaries westward so that it has shed both Washington and Tangipahoa parishes (including Hammond, home of James H. Morrison, who represented the district for 24 years, the longest tenure of anyone ever to represent the district) to the 1st district.

For most of its existence, the district's lines generally followed parish lines. In the 1990s redistricting, however, most of the district's black voters were transferred to the black-majority 4th district. Those lines, however, were thrown out in 1995 when the 4th was ruled to be an unconstitutional racial gerrymander, and from 1996 to 2013, the 6th included all of Baton Rouge. After the 2010 redistricting, a gash in western Baton Rouge, including most of the city's black precincts, was transferred to the New Orleans-based 2nd district.

Recent presidential elections

List of members representing the district

Recent election results

2002

2004

2006

2008

2010

2012

2014

2016

2018

2020

2022

Historical district boundaries

See also

 Louisiana's congressional districts
 List of United States congressional districts

References

 
 
 Congressional Biographical Directory of the United States 1774–present

06